Lázaro is a Spanish or Portuguese-based given name or surname. Notable people with the name include:

Given name
Lázaro (footballer, born 1990), full name Lázaro Vinícius Alves Martins, Brazilian footballer
Lázaro (footballer, born 2002), full name Lázaro Vinícius Marques, Brazilian footballer
Lázaro Álvarez, Cuban boxer
Lázaro Báez, Argentine entrepreneur
Lázaro Barbosa de Sousa, Brazilian serial killer and family annihilator
Lázaro Betancourt, Cuban triple jumper
Lázaro Blanco, Mexican photographer
Lázaro Borges, Cuban pole vaulter
Lázaro Botelho, Brazilian politician
Lázaro Bruzón, Cuban chess player
Lázaro Darcourt, Cuban footballer
Lázaro Francisco, Filipino novelist
Lázaro Garza Ayala, Mexican politician
Lázaro Macapagal, Filipino colonel
Lázaro Medina, Cuban pitcher
Lázaro Navarro, Cuban tennis player
Lázaro Oliveira, Angolan footballer
Lázaro Ramos, Brazilian actor
Lázaro Ruiz, Cuban weightlifter
Lázaro Reinoso, Cuban wrestler
Lázaro Rivas, Cuban wrestler

Surname
Andrea Lázaro García, Spanish tennis player
Borja Lázaro, Spanish footballer
Carlos Lázaro, Spanish footballer
Cheche Lazaro, Filipino journalist
David Lázaro, Spanish footballer
Emilio Martínez-Lázaro, Spanish film director
Ezequiel Lázaro, Argentine footballer
Fernando Lázaro, Brazilian performance analyst
Francisco Lázaro, Portuguese athlete
Hipólito Lázaro, Spanish singer
Irmão Lázaro, born Antonio Lázaro da Silva, Brazilian singer
José Lázaro Galdiano, Spanish financier, journalist, publisher and art collector
José Lázaro Robles (1924–1996), commonly known as Pinga, Brazilian footballer
Josué Lázaro, Mexican footballer
Paloma Lázaro, Spanish footballer
Paola Lázaro, Puerto Rican actress
Rosalía Lázaro, Spanish paralympic athlete
Valentino Lazaro, Austrian footballer

See also
Lázaro Cárdenas (disambiguation)
Lázaro Martínez (disambiguation)

Portuguese masculine given names
Spanish masculine given names